SingleThread is a farm, restaurant, and inn, located in Healdsburg, California.

Farm, restaurant, and inn 

In 2014, Kyle and Katina Connaughton bought property in Sonoma County, California for a five-acre farm, restaurant, and inn located in downtown Healdsburg. They worked over two years to cultivate the farm's vegetables and flowers, olive trees, fruit orchards, beehives, chickens, and cattle. They prepared the inn and developed a menu for the restaurant, opening in December 2016 as SingleThread.

The menu at SingleThread combines Japanese influences with farm-to-table ingredients. The dinner menu features 11 courses, with vegetarian, pescatarian, and omnivore options and dishes changing each night.

Eater named SingleThread one of the most beautiful restaurants of 2016, and the restaurant's design won a James Beard Award in 2017. It was designed by AvroKO.

The San Francisco Chronicle gave the restaurant four stars. The World's 50 Best Restaurants named SingleThread its "One To Watch" in 2018. The Michelin Guide awarded SingleThread two stars in the 2018 Michelin Guide for San Francisco, and three stars in 2019. There are 13 three-star restaurants in the United States, with six of them being in California.

Owners Kyle and Katina Connaughton 

The Connaughtons were high school classmates in the suburbs of Los Angeles who married and  had two daughters, Chloe and Ava. Kyle and Katina had life long dreams of opening their own farm and restaurant in Northern California.

Kyle Connaughton attended culinary school and worked in several notable restaurants in Los Angeles, including Spago, Campanile, and Suzanne Goin’s AOC and Lucques. Connaughton then trained as a sushi chef, working under Andy Matsuda at the Sushi Chef Institute. In 2003, Connaughton moved to Japan to work for Michel Bras in Hokkaido. In 2006,  Connaughton moved to England to work for Heston Blumenthal at The Fat Duck. During their travels, Katina Connaughton studied sustainable agriculture and English and Japanese gardens.

In 2015, Kyle Connaughton published a cookbook, Donabe: Classic and Modern Japanese Clay Pot Cooking with Naoko Takei Moore.

See also
 List of Michelin 3-star restaurants
 List of Michelin 3-star restaurants in the United States

References

External links 

 

Michelin Guide starred restaurants in California
James Beard Foundation Award winners